The Desert Sheik is a 1924 American silent drama film directed by Tom Terriss and starring Wanda Hawley, Nigel Barrie and Pedro de Cordoba. British star Stewart Rome also appears in a supporting role. The story is inspired by the 1898 novel The Tragedy of the Korosko by Arthur Conan Doyle.

Synopsis
An American woman in Egypt falls in love with a major in the British Army. While on a trip through the desert they are attacked by Bedouins, and the woman captured. British troops stage a rescue mission.

Cast
 Wanda Hawley as Corinne Adams 
 Nigel Barrie as Major Egerton 
 Pedro de Cordoba as Prince Ibrahim 
 Edith Craig as Miss Adams 
 Arthur M. Cullin as Sir Charles Roden 
 Stewart Rome as Reverend Roden 
 Douglas Munro as Mansoor 
 Percy Standing as Stephen Belmont 
 Cyril Smith as Lord Howard Cecil 
 Hamed El Gabrey as Emir - Desert Sheik

References

Bibliography
 Munden, Kenneth White. The American Film Institute Catalog of Motion Pictures Produced in the United States, Part 1. University of California Press, 1997.

External links
 

1924 films
1924 drama films
1920s English-language films
American silent feature films
Silent American drama films
Films directed by Tom Terriss
American black-and-white films
Film Booking Offices of America films
Films set in Egypt
Films based on British novels
1920s American films